Kikuo (written: 喜久夫, 喜久雄, 喜久男 or 規矩雄) is a masculine Japanese given name. Notable people with the name include:

, Japanese golfer
, Japanese scientist
, Japanese poet and mathematician
, Japanese sport wrestler
R. Kikuo Johnson (born 1981), American illustrator and cartoonist

Japanese masculine given names